WFLE (1060 AM) was a Flemingsburg, Kentucky, United States, radio station broadcasting a country music format. It was first licensed in 1981.

Dreamcatcher Communications, Inc. surrendered the station's license to the Federal Communications Commission for cancellation on May 27, 2020, and the FCC cancelled the license on May 28.

References

External link
FCC Station Search Details: DWFLE (Facility ID: 21717)

FLE
FLE
Radio stations established in 1985
Radio stations disestablished in 2020
1985 establishments in Kentucky
2020 disestablishments in Kentucky
FLE
Defunct radio stations in the United States
Fleming County, Kentucky